The Germany national American football team, nicknamed the Men in Black, is the official American football senior national team of Germany. They are organized by the American Football Verband Deutschland (AFVD). They get their players from teams of the German Football League (GFL).

Results

IFAF World Championship record

European Championships
 1983: Third place
 1985: Third place
 1987: Runner up
 1989: Third place
 1991: Did not qualify
 1993: Third place
 1995: Did not participate
 1997: Did not qualify
 2000: Runner up
 2001: Champions
 2005: Runner up
 2010: Champions
 2014: Champions
 2018: Excluded after qualification
 2021: Did not participate

World Games
 2005: Champions
 2017: Runner-up

Current roster

External links
Official website at AFVD.

American Football
American football in Germany
Germany
1981 establishments in West Germany
American football teams established in 1981